Gonyostomum is a genus of freshwater algae in the class Raphidophyceae. They include the species Gonyostomum semen, which causes nuisance algal blooms.

References 

Ochrophyta
Heterokont genera